WTLF (channel 24) is a television station in Tallahassee, Florida, United States, affiliated with The CW Plus. It is owned by MPS Media, which maintains a local marketing agreement (LMA) with New Age Media, owner of Bainbridge, Georgia–licensed Heroes & Icons affiliate WTLH (channel 49), for the provision of certain services.

WTLF and WTLH share studios on Commerce Boulevard in Midway, Florida, where WTLF's transmitter is also located. Master control and some internal operations are based at the facilities of dual NBC/Fox affiliate WTWC-TV (channel 40, owned by Sinclair Broadcast Group) on Deerlake South in unincorporated Leon County, Florida, northwest of Bradfordville (with a Tallahassee postal address).

Even though WTLF broadcasts a digital signal of its own, it only covers the immediate Tallahassee area. As a result, it is simulcast in full 1080i high definition on WTLH's second digital subchannel in order to reach the entire market. This can be seen on channel 49.2 from its transmitter in unincorporated Thomas County, Georgia, southeast of Metcalf, along the Florida state line. WTLF does have a construction permit granted by the Federal Communications Commission (FCC) to relocate its transmitter to WTLH's site.

History
It began broadcasting operations on May 7, 2003 as a full-time satellite of UPN affiliate WFXU in Live Oak, Florida. Although that station had become Tallahassee's UPN affiliate a year earlier, its signal was not nearly strong enough to cover the entire market and WTLF was intended to make up for this shortfall in coverage.

WFXU had originally been established back in 1998 as a full-time satellite of WTLH for the same reason. WTLF was one of the first stations in the United States to sign-on as a digital-only station with no analog counterpart. Originally, this station was owned by KB Prime Media but operated by Pegasus Communications (owner of WFXU and WTLH at that time) under a local marketing agreement.

Pegasus declared bankruptcy in June 2004 over a dispute with DirecTV (then co-owned with Fox by News Corporation) over marketing of the direct broadcast satellite service to rural areas. On April 1, 2005, WFXU/WTLF switched to The WB through The WB 100+. As a result, UPN promptly signed with WCTV (channel 6) which launched a new second subchannel to carry the network. Prior to this, The WB was carried on a cable-exclusive station (with the faux calls "WBXT") which was operated and promoted by ABC affiliate WTXL-TV (channel 27) in partnership with The WB 100+.

On January 24, 2006, CBS and Time Warner announced that they were "merging" their UPN and WB networks to create The CW effective September 2006. On February 22, News Corporation announced it would start up another new network called MyNetworkTV. This new service, which would be a sister network to Fox, would be operated by Fox Television Stations and its syndication division Twentieth Television. MyNetworkTV was created in order to give UPN and WB stations, not mentioned as becoming CW affiliates, another option besides becoming independent in addition to competing against The CW.

It was announced on April 24 that WTLH would create a new second digital subchannel to become Tallahassee's CW affiliate. These plans were later modified in August to make WFXU/WTLF the primary CW affiliate with a simulcast provided on WTLH-DT2. This arrangement took effect when the network premiered on September 18 while, back on September 5, WCTV's UPN subchannel joined MyNetworkTV. The Pegasus station group was sold in August 2006 to private investment firm CP Media, LLC of Wilkes-Barre, Pennsylvania for $55.5 million. Eventually, CP Media formed a new media company, New Age Media. Around this time, KB Prime Media sold WTLF to Mystic Broadcast Group which in turn promptly sold it to MPS Media. Meanwhile, WFXU was eventually sold to Budd Broadcasting and became a separate outlet leaving WTLF and WTLH-DT2 as Tallahassee's CW affiliate.

On September 25, 2013, New Age Media announced that it would sell most of its stations to the Sinclair Broadcast Group. In order to comply with FCC ownership restrictions, since Sinclair already owns WTWC, its partner company Cunningham Broadcasting planned to acquire the WTLH license but Sinclair was slated to operate the station (as well as WTLF, which would have been acquired by another sidecar operation, Deerfield Media) through shared services agreements.

On October 31, 2014, New Age Media requested the dismissal of its application to sell WTLH; the next day, Sinclair purchased the non-license assets of WTLF and WTLH and began operating them through a master service agreement. At some point after the transaction occurred, Sinclair moved WTLH's Fox affiliation to WTWC's second subchannel. At that point, MeTV programming moved from WTLH's third digital subchannel to its main channel; the simulcast of WTLF continues on that outlet's second subchannel.

On July 28, 2021, the FCC issued a Forfeiture Order stemming from a lawsuit against MPS Media. The lawsuit, filed by AT&T, alleged that MPS Media failed to negotiate for retransmission consent in good faith for the stations. Owners of other Sinclair-managed stations, such as Deerfield Media, were also named in the lawsuit. MPS was ordered to pay a fine of $512,288.

Subchannels
The station's digital signal is multiplexed:

References

External links
WTLF "The CW Tallahassee"
MeTV Website
WTWC-TV "NBC 40"
WTWC-DT2 "Fox 49"

Television channels and stations established in 2003
2003 establishments in Florida
TLF
The CW affiliates
Comet (TV network) affiliates
TBD (TV network) affiliates
Stadium (sports network) affiliates
Dabl affiliates